Ivan Derevsky (born 8 April 1966) is a Soviet sports shooter. He competed in the mixed trap event at the 1992 Summer Olympics.

References

1966 births
Living people
Soviet male sport shooters
Olympic shooters of the Unified Team
Shooters at the 1992 Summer Olympics
Place of birth missing (living people)